Stuart Weller (26 December 1870, Maine, New York – 1927) was an American paleontologist and geologist.

Weller studied geology and paleontology at Cornell University with bachelor's degree in 1894 and at Yale University with Ph.D. in 1901. Beginning in 1895 he worked at the University of Chicago, where in 1897–1900 he was a research associate, and became in 1900 Instructor, in 1902 Assistant Professor, in 1908 Associate Professor and in 1915 Professor of Paleontology and Geology. It is noteworthy to mention that Weller supervised Grace Anne Stewart, the first Canadian female to earn a B.A. majoring in geology, as she earned her Ph.D. from the University of Chicago.

In 1897 he married; the marriage produced three sons.

From 1919 until his death, in addition to his professorship, he was the director of the Walker Museum at the University of Chicago. In 1926 he was the president of the Paleontological Society.

Selected works

with Stuart St. Clair:

References

External links
 
Guide to the Stuart Weller Papers 1900-1927 at the University of Chicago Special Collections Research Center

1870 births
1927 deaths
American paleontologists
American geologists
Cornell University College of Agriculture and Life Sciences alumni
Yale University alumni
University of Chicago faculty
People from Broome County, New York
Scientists from New York (state)